Ulrike Louise of Solms-Braunfels (1 May 1731 in Hungen, Landgraviate of Hesse-Darmstadt – 12 September 1792 in Bad Homburg) was a German regent, Landgravine of Hesse-Homburg by marriage to  Frederick IV of Hesse-Homburg , and regent of Hesse-Homburg, on behalf of her minor son Frederick V Louis William Christian from 1751 to 1766.

Early life 
Ulrike Louise was a daughter of Prince Frederick William of Solms-Braunfels (1696–1761) and his second wife, Countess Sophie Magdalene of Solms-Laubach-Utphe (1701–1744), daughter of Count Otto of Solms-Laubach-Utphe (1673-1743) and Countess Luise Albertine of Schönburg-Waldenburg (1686-1740).

Biography 
She married on 10 October 1746 in Hungen her cousin, Landgrave Frederick IV of Hesse-Homburg (1724–1751). Shortly after the wedding, troops from Hesse-Darmstadt marched into Hesse-Homburg and occupied it and city of Bad Homburg with Homburg Castle. The dispute could be arbitrated, and Frederick IV was reinstated as ruling Landgrave.

After her husband died in 1751, she took up government, with imperial permission, together with Landgrave Louis VIII of Hesse-Darmstadt, for her son Frederick V, who was only three years old when his father died. She managed to preserve the sovereignty of Hesse-Homburg and marry her son to a daughter of Landgrave Louis IX of Hesse-Darmstadt.

Issue 
From her marriage with Frederick IV, Ulrike Louise had two children:
 Frederick V Louis William Christian (Homburg, 30 January 1748 – Homburg, 20 January 1820), Landgrave of Hesse-Homburg.
 Marie Christine Charlotte Wilhelmine (Homburg, 4 November 1749 – Homburg, 10 November 1750).

References 
Johann I. von Gerning: Die Lahn- und Main-Gegenden von Embs bis Frankfurt p. 163 ff

External links 
 Entry at Womeninpower

1731 births
1792 deaths
People from Giessen (district)
People from the Landgraviate of Hesse-Darmstadt
House of Solms
House of Hesse-Homburg
18th-century women rulers
Regents of Germany
18th-century German people
House of Solms-Braunfels